Frank Beube was an American periodontist and a pioneer in the field of periodontics.

Education
Beube graduated from the University of Toronto Faculty of Dentistry in 1930 and then moved to the United States.

Career
Beube served as director of the Department of Periodontology after having volunteers on faculty in the 1930s.

Legacy
In honor of his service to the Department of Periodontology, the postgraduate periodontics conference room on VC-7 of the Columbia University College of Dental Medicine is called the Frank Beube Conference Room.

References

Periodontists
University of Toronto alumni
Year of birth missing
Year of death missing